The Dunn Memorial Bridge, officially known as the Private Parker F. Dunn Memorial Bridge, carries US 9 and US 20 across the Hudson River between Albany, New York and Rensselaer, New York.

Description
Completed in 1969 to replace an earlier span bearing the same name, the highway bridge has a steel girder design. It is the southernmost toll-free road crossing of the Hudson. It is named for Parker F. Dunn, an Albany native who was posthumously awarded the Medal of Honor for his service in World War I.

While traveling eastbound on the Dunn Memorial Bridge towards the City of Rensselaer, there is a noticeable stub where the road ends and traffic is "forced off" the bridge onto offramps for US Routes 9 and 20. The road was originally supposed to continue on as part of the canceled South Mall Expressway to Interstate 90 at present day Exit 8.

Rensselaer's Riverfront Park is located under the eastern end of the bridge. Peregrine falcons have been observed nesting under the roadway since 1998, and the New York State Department of Environmental Conservation set up a webcam to monitor them.

On July 27, 2005, the bridge was temporarily closed when a ramp leading to the Empire State Plaza split vertically, causing the roadbed to drop more than a foot. The Department of Transportation was alerted to the situation by a call from a commuter who had driven over the gap. Two steel towers were installed to support the ramp and it was later repaired.

On March 25, 2014, a man jumped off the bridge following a police chase in connection with a shooting the previous night. The man survived and was evacuated via ambulance.

Bicycle and pedestrian access

Bicyclists and pedestrians may use the sidewalk along the north side of the bridge.

Gallery

See also 
 
 
 
 List of fixed crossings of the Hudson River

References

External links 
 
 Dunn Memorial Bridge at Capital Highways
 Dunn Memorial Bridge at Everything2
 
 "Damage shuts down Dunn Memorial Bridge" at WNYT
 Peregrine Falcons in Albany 
 YouTube video of driving over the bridge
 Parker F. Dunn Medal of Honor Citation

Bridges completed in 1969
Bridges over the Hudson River
Buildings and structures in Albany, New York
Bridges in Rensselaer County, New York
Monuments and memorials in New York (state)
Road bridges in New York (state)
Bridges in Albany County, New York
Transportation in Albany, New York
U.S. Route 20
U.S. Route 9
Unfinished buildings and structures in the United States
Bridges of the United States Numbered Highway System
Girder bridges in the United States
Steel bridges in the United States
1969 establishments in New York (state)